Ahmad Mowla (also Romanized as Aḩmad Mowlā; also known as Sheykh Aḩmad) is a village in Hoseynabad Rural District, in the Central District of Shush County, Khuzestan Province, Iran. At the 2006 census, its population was 1,641, in 194 families.

References 

Populated places in Shush County